Wavyleaf may refer to:

 Wavyleaf basketgrass, an extremely invasive grass
 Wavyleaf Indian paintbrush, a parasitic plant
 Wavyleaf sea-lavender, a herbaceous perennial plant
 Wavyleaf silktassel, a common evergreen shrub